The Osella PA4 is a Group 6 (Sports 2000) prototype racing car designed, developed, and built by Osella, to compete in the World Sportscar Championship sports car racing series between 1976 and 1980. It was powered by a number of different engines, including the  BMW M12/7, and the Cosworth BDG. The  and  Cosworth FVA and Cosworth FVC were also used. It was even powered by a Ferrari 2.0 V8 engine.

References 

Osella vehicles
Mid-engined cars